Greatest Hits is the fourth album by German trance group Groove Coverage and their first Greatest Hits album released in Germany. The first single from the album was "Because I Love You".

Track listing

CD 1

 "Because I Love You" – 3:08
 "7 Years and 50 Days" – 3:44
 "Million Tears" – 3:13
 "God Is A Girl" – 3:38
 "Summer Rain" – 4:00
 "Moonlight Shadow" – 2:52
 "Nothing Lasts Forever" – 3:04
 "The End" – 3:38
 "Little June" – 3:38
 "Poison" – 3:06
 "Runaway" – 3:06
 "Last Unicorn" – 3:54
 "Angel From Above" – 3:10
 "Living On A Prayer" – 3:19
 "Call Me" – 3:34
 "Holy Virgin" – 3:49

CD 2

 "Moonlight Shadow (Pure & Direct Version)" – 4:18
 "She" – 3:51
 "November Night" – 3:22
 "Only Love" – 3:29
 "Remember" – 3:19
 "When Love Lives In Heaven" – 3:43
 "Far Away From Home" – 4:19
 "When Life" – 4:07
 "Lullaby For Love" – 3:12
 "You" – 03:34
 "On the Radio" – 2:59
 "21st Century Digital Girl" – 2:53
 "I Need You (DJ Uhey Rmx)" – 5:34
 "21st Century (DJ Satomi Remix)" – 6:07
 "She (Skam Remix)" – 5:54

Groove Coverage albums
2007 greatest hits albums